"King of Pain" is a song by English rock band the Police, released as the final single from their fifth and final studio album Synchronicity (1983). Written by the band's lead singer and bassist Sting as a post-separation song from his wife, "King of Pain" conjures up symbols of pain and relates them to a man's soul. A&M Records released "King of Pain" as the album's fourth single in the UK, while in many other countries it was released as the second single.

The song received acclaim from music critics, many of whom praised Sting's lyrics and cited the song as a highlight from Synchronicity. In the United Kingdom, it reached  in January 1984.

Multiple artists have covered "King of Pain". Canadian singer-songwriter Alanis Morissette covered the track for her MTV Unplugged album (1999) and released it as the second single from the album.

Background and release 
"King of Pain" was released as the second single in the US and the fourth single in the UK, taken from their fifth and final album, Synchronicity (1983). The song was released after "Every Breath You Take"'s eight-week appearance on top of the charts. Sting's fascination with Carl Jung and, to a greater extent, Arthur Koestler inspired him to write the track. As a Hungarian-born novelist who resided in England, Koestler was enthralled with parapsychology and the unexplained workings of the mind (he wrote the book titled The Ghost in the Machine in the late '60s, after which the Police named their fourth album). A music video was made but only released in Australia.

Engineer/co-producer Hugh Padgham remembers this song as being one of several songs that had been heavily reformed and edited during the mixing stage. He explains:

The multitrack recording bore little or no resemblance to the final mix that was included on the album The introductory section with the piano and vocals was recorded separately on a different date and was edited into the main song.

Composition and lyrics 
"King of Pain" was written by Sting, while production was done by The Police and Hugh Padgham. The song was inspired by Sting's then-recent separation from his first wife. He remarked, "I conjured up symbols of pain and related them to my soul. A black spot on the sun struck me as being a very painful image, and I felt that was my soul up there on the sun. It's just projecting your state into the world of symbolism, which is what poetry's all about, really."

Reception

Critical 
The song received acclaim from music critics. Stephen Thomas Erlewine of Allmusic picked the song as a highlight from the album, writing that "King of Pain" and "Wrapped Around Your Finger", "are devilishly infectious new wave singles." Sputnikmusic website picked it as an "essential track", writing that "King of Pain", "Every Breath You Take" and "Wrapped Around Your Finger", "rely on gorgeous, understated melodies, embracing the primary sonic overtones encompassing the record." Michael Roffman of Consequence of Sound chose the track as "one of his personal favorite Sting-led tracks," pairing it next to his other works like "If I Ever Lose My Faith in You" or "Fields of Gold".  Ultimate Classic Rock critic Mike Duquette rated "King of Pain" as the Police's 5th best song, saying "that singsong piano hook, the melodic bass and a simple, effective solo by Summers make what could have been a pity party into a sterling pop/rock offering that not even "Weird Al" Yankovic could improve upon."  In its contemporary review of the single, Cashbox said that the song "doesn’t connect as immediately as 'Every Breath You Take' but grows in evocative power," as "primeval rhythms and gruesome natural imagery seem to place the darkly complex piece in another world."

Commercial 

Elsewhere, the song performed modestly. In the United Kingdom, the song reached , one of the lowest charting-singles since their first single, "Fall Out" (1979). In Ireland, the song proved to be more successful, reaching , becoming their third top-ten single. In Belgium (Flanders) and Germany, the song became their lowest charting-single.

Track listing

7": A&M / AM 176 (UK) 
 "King of Pain" – 4:59
 "Tea in the Sahara" (Live) – 5:05

7": A&M / AM-2569 (US) 
 "King of Pain" – 4:59
 "Someone to Talk To" – 3:08

7": A&M / AMS 9722 (NL) 
 "King of Pain" – 4:59
 "Once upon a Daydream" – 3:28

12": A&M / AMX 176 (UK) 
 "King of Pain" – 4:59
 "Tea in the Sahara" (Live) – 5:05

Personnel
Sting – lead and backing vocals, bass guitar, piano, synthesizers
Andy Summers – electric guitars
Stewart Copeland – drums, marimba, percussion

Charts

Sales

Alanis Morissette version

Canadian singer-songwriter Alanis Morissette covered "King of Pain" for her MTV Unplugged album, on 18 September 1999. The song was released as the album's second single on 19 April 2000. Morissette shifted the word "king" to "queen" towards the end of the track. Critics gave the track favourable reviews, with some calling a "tender" ballad, and others naming it outstanding. The song only managed to chart in Brazil and Netherlands.

Background and writing 
"King of Pain" was one of the songs Alanis selected to perform on her MTV Unplugged special on 18 September 1999. "King of Pain" was released as the second single from the album on 19 April 2000. The CD Single features "King of Pain" and three songs recorded for the Unplugged special, but not included on the album: "Thank U", "Baba" and "Your House".

Critical reception 
Neva Chonin of Rolling Stone wrote that "songs with lusher orchestral backdrops – "You Oughta Know," "Uninvited" and the Police's "King of Pain" – still carry lengthy, vocalcentric intros." Beth Johnson of Entertainment Weekly called it " a tender cover". Chris Massey of PopMatters called it a "folksy cover which comes across exceedingly well." Massey commented that, "Sting's haunting vocals on the original song by The Police are almost overshadowed by the similarly chilling vocals of Alanis herself —almost. When the band kicks in – the bass is almost overpowering – and Alanis belts out the familiar chorus 'I have stood here before inside the pouring rain / With the world turning circles, running around my brain,' the power is outstanding."

Track listing
 "King of Pain" (MTV Unplugged) – 4:05
 Thank U (MTV Unplugged) – 4:11	
 Baba (MTV Unplugged) – 5:11
 Your House (MTV Unplugged) – 4:37

Charts

Other cover versions
American rock band Mudvayne released the track on their album  By the People, for the People in 2007.
American recording artist Lady Gaga performed the track along with Sting at iHeart Radio Festival in 2011; they also performed the track "Stand by Me". Their rendition of "King of Pain" was lauded by critics. Louis Virtel of The Backlot called it "the best version of the song you'll ever hear," praising Gaga for "sporting teal streaks and some Stevie Nicks drapery, and Sting is (of course) wearing Under Armour, basically. Excellent performance."

"Weird Al" Yankovic parodied the song as "King of Suede" in his 1984 album "Weird Al" Yankovic in 3-D.

See also 
List of RPM number-one singles of 1983
List of number-one mainstream rock hits (United States)

References 

1983 singles
1983 songs
The Police songs
Alanis Morissette songs
A&M Records singles
Reprise Records singles
Maverick Records singles
RPM Top Singles number-one singles
Songs written by Sting (musician)
Song recordings produced by Hugh Padgham